Andreyevka is a rural locality (a selo) in Alexandrovskoye Rural Settlement, Zhirnovsky District, Volgograd Oblast, Russia. The population was 427 as of 2010. There are 5 streets.

Geography 
Andreyevka is located in steppe, on Khopyorsko-Buzulukskaya Plain, 10 km west of Zhirnovsk (the district's administrative centre) by road. Zhirnovsk is the nearest rural locality.

References 

Rural localities in Zhirnovsky District